Carli Biessels (1936 – 16 September 2016) was a Dutch writer of children's literature.

Biography 

Biessels was born and died in Nijmegen, where she studied pedagogy. Biessels worked in the field of children psychiatry and orthopedagogy.

Before writing books for children Biessels wrote various stories for children's magazines Okki and Taptoe. Biessels made her debut as author at 62 years of age with her book Twee druppels water (1998). The book was on the Longlist for the Gouden Uil award in 1999.

In 2010, she won the Woutertje Pieterse Prijs for her book Juwelen van stras. She also received the Vlag en Wimpel award in 2001 for her book De feestrede and in 2007 for her book Irah en de dieren. Her last book Ik moet je iets belangrijks vertellen (2016) was published posthumously.

Her books have been illustrated by various illustrators, including Martijn van der Linden, Harmen van Straaten and Marije Tolman. Other illustrators include Patsy Backx, Marjolein Hund and Wolf Erlbruch. Her book Anton en het kamelenkleed (1999) was illustrated by one of her daughters.

Some of her books have been translated to German by Hanni Ehlers and Mirjam Pressler.

Biessels married and had four children.

Awards 

 2001: Vlag en Wimpel, De feestrede
 2007: Vlag en Wimpel, Irah en de dieren
 2010: Woutertje Pieterse Prijs, Juwelen van stras

Publications 

 Twee druppels water (1998)
 Anton en het kamelenkleed (1999)
 Sinterklaas' verhalen: over mijterrekjes, voetbalschoenen en de rode staf (1999)
 De buurman van de Magere Heinen (2000)
 De feestrede (2000)
 Tussen Mees en Mol (2002)
 De zee, de zee (2002)
 Doortje wil naar de zee kijken (2003)
 Op doortocht (2004)
 De meeste dingen gebeurden onverwachts (2005)
 Irah en de dieren (2006)
 Geknipt (2008)
 Juwelen van stras (2009)
 Lucas en de woorden: een verhaal over leren lezen (2011)
 Ik moet je iets belangrijks vertellen (2016)

References

External links 

 Carli Biessels (in Dutch) Digital Library for Dutch Literature

1936 births
2016 deaths
Dutch children's writers
Dutch women children's writers
Woutertje Pieterse Prize winners
People from Nijmegen